Mika Jukka Petteri Lehto (born 13 March 1961 in Turku, Finland) is a Finnish retired professional ice hockey player who played in the National Hockey League and SM-liiga.  He played for TPS, KalPa, and Pittsburgh Penguins. After his playing career, Lehto became an NHL agent. His brother Joni is a scout for the Colorado Avalanche. Lehto played for team Finland in the 1984 Sarajevo Olympics.

Career statistics

Regular season and playoffs

International

References

External links 

1961 births
Finnish ice hockey defencemen
Ice hockey players at the 1984 Winter Olympics
KalPa players
Living people
Olympic ice hockey players of Finland
Pittsburgh Penguins players
Sportspeople from Turku
HC TPS players
Undrafted National Hockey League players